St. Dimitrij Solunski Macedonian Orthodox Church (Makedonska Pravoslavna Crkva „Sv. Dimitrij Solunski“) is the Macedonian Orthodox church located in Springvale, a suburb of southeastern Melbourne, Victoria, Australia.

In 1982, Macedonian people residing in Springvale and surrounding suburbs led efforts to establish a Macedonian church presence at Springvale. The Macedonian Orthodox Metropolitan for Australia, Timotej, first consecrated the church in 1986. In early 1994, as tense relations between Greek Australians and Macedonian Australians developed after the Republic of North Macedonia gained recognition from Australia, the church was subjected to an arson attack. After a renovation, the church was re-consecrated in 1996 by Petar, the present Metropolitan for Australia. In 2009 renovations and new extension of the church commenced. The works and the final project was completed in 2012. Same year final consecration was done by Metropolitan Petar.

See also 

 Macedonian Australians

References

External links 
Facebook

Macedonian Orthodox churches in Melbourne
1986 establishments in Australia
Churches completed in 1986
Macedonian-Australian culture
Buildings and structures in the City of Greater Dandenong